Benjamin Abraham Horowitz (born June 13, 1966) is an American businessman, investor, blogger, and author. He is a technology entrepreneur and co-founder of the venture capital firm Andreessen Horowitz along with Marc Andreessen. He previously co-founded and served as president and chief executive officer of the enterprise software company Opsware, which Hewlett-Packard acquired in 2007. Horowitz is the author of The Hard Thing About Hard Things: Building a Business When There Are No Easy Answers, a book about startups, and What You Do Is Who You Are: How to Create Your Business Culture.

Early life and education
Horowitz was born Benjamin Abraham Horowitz in London, England and raised in Berkeley, California, the son of Elissa Krauthamer and conservative writer and policy advocate David Horowitz. Horowitz's great-grandparents were Jewish immigrants from the Russian Empire who arrived in the U.S. in the mid-19th and early 20th centuries.

Horowitz earned a BA in Computer Science from Columbia University in 1988 and an MS in Computer Science from UCLA in 1990.

Career
Horowitz began his career as an engineer at Silicon Graphics in 1990. In 1995, Horowitz joined Marc Andreessen at Netscape as a product manager. From 1997 to 1998, Horowitz was vice president for the Directory and Security Product Line at Netscape. After Netscape was acquired by AOL in 1998, Horowitz served as Vice President of AOL's eCommerce Division.

In September 1999, Horowitz cofounded Loudcloud with Andreessen, Tim Howes, and In Sik Rhee. Loudcloud offered infrastructure and application hosting services to enterprise and Internet customers such as Ford Motor Company, Nike, Inc., Gannett Company, News Corporation, the United States Army and other large organizations. Horowitz took Loudcloud public on March 9, 2001.

In June 2002, Horowitz began a transformation of Loudcloud into Opsware, an enterprise software company. He took the first step by selling Loudcloud's core managed services business to Electronic Data Systems for $63.5 million in cash. This transaction transferred 100% of Loudcloud's revenue to EDS while the company was publicly traded on NASDAQ.  Beginning with EDS as its first enterprise software customer, Horowitz grew Opsware to hundreds of enterprise customers, over $100 million in annual revenue, and 550 employees. In July 2007, Horowitz sold Opsware to Hewlett-Packard for $1.6 billion in cash.

Horowitz was Loudcloud's and Opsware's President and Chief Executive Officer for the entire history of the company. Along the way, shares of Opsware IPO'ed at $6, sank to $0.35 per share at its nadir and traded at $14.25 a share at the time of its sale to HP.

Following the sale of Opsware to Hewlett-Packard, Horowitz then spent one year at Hewlett-Packard as Vice President and General Manager in HP Software with responsibility for 3,000 employees and $2.8 billion in annual revenue.

Andreessen Horowitz
On July 6, 2009, Horowitz and Andreessen launched Andreessen Horowitz, to invest in and advise both early-stage startups and more established growth companies in high technology. Andreessen Horowitz began with an initial capitalization of $300 million and within three years had $2.7 billion under management across three funds.

Personal life
Horowitz lives in Atherton, California with his wife, Felicia Wiley Horowitz. They married in 1988 and have three children.

References

External links

 Ben's Blog

1966 births
Living people
American bloggers
American computer businesspeople
American investors
American technology company founders
American technology chief executives
Berkeley High School (Berkeley, California) alumni
Businesspeople from Berkeley, California
Businesspeople in software
Columbia College (New York) alumni
Computer engineers
Engineers from California
Jewish American philanthropists
Jewish American scientists
Jewish engineers
Writers from Berkeley, California
Private equity and venture capital investors
University of California, Los Angeles alumni
Andreessen Horowitz
People from Atherton, California
Netscape people
British emigrants to the United States
American people of Russian-Jewish descent
21st-century American Jews